Ming Chuan University F.C., commonly known by their abbreviation MCU, is a Taiwanese university association football club which currently competes in the  Taiwan Second Division Football League. The club plays their home matches on the Taoyuan campus of Ming Chuan University.

See also

 Football in Taiwan

External links

 Ming Chuan University logo
 Ming Chuan University official site

Football clubs in Taiwan
Ming Chuan University
University and college football clubs in Taiwan